Steve Hass (born May 11, 1975) is an American drummer based in Los Angeles. Originally from Island Park, New York, born to Greek immigrant parents from Athens. He is notable for his technical skill, time feel, and his musical versatility, having played with many artists from a wide variety of genres.

Career
After attending Berklee College of Music on scholarship from 1993–1996 Steve was asked to join the Ravi Coltrane Quartet. He toured and recorded with the band from 1996 to 2002. The music was a mixture of traditional jazz, funk, and odd meter fusion. During this time Steve was also a studio drummer in New York City playing on dozens of national jingles, record dates,  television shows, and movie soundtracks. He was also a member of Ruben Wilson's "Masters Of Groove" where he shared the drum chair with the legendary Bernard Purdie.   In addition, during this period Steve toured with Christian McBride, Suzanne Vega, Miri Ben-Ari, Bob Berg, and Richard Bona amongst others.

In 2003 Steve began touring and recording with multiple Grammy winners and Atlantic recording artists, The Manhattan Transfer. He remains the first call drummer for The Manhattan Transfer, and works with them as his schedule permits. He is the first touring drummer in the history of the band to actually record with them. He is featured on 3 album releases and 1 live concert DVD. In late 2003, Hass released a solo album named Traveler. The C.D displays Hass' skills as a talented producer. His usage of sonic layering and drum loops is reminiscent of Jon Brion.

In 2005 Steve joined John Scofield and Mavis Staples to support Scofield's Verve release "That's What I'd Say".  The band toured around the world from 2005 until December 2007 playing R+B, Soul, Jazz and Latin. .  Scofield also used Steve in his jazz trio, along with bassist John Benitez for select local N.Y dates.

In 2006 Hass had an eight-page feature interview in Modern Drummer Magazine. He is now a regular educational contributor in the "ask a pro" and "workshop" columns.

Los Angeles

In 2007 Steve established a second residence in Los Angeles and quickly became a popular choice for musicians and producers on the L.A scene, both live and in the studio.  His company Hassbeat Productions Inc. provides studio services to artists worldwide while allowing Steve to record drum tracks for a variety of artists around the world. He continues to tour with a variety of artists. Since moving to Los Angeles Steve has become a regular with renowned  artists such as Billy Childs, Bob Sheppard, Brandon Fields and Alan Pasqua as well as maintaining his presence in the studio with contemporary rock singer/songwriters. 2012 has been his busiest year yet juggling recording sessions for producers The Difference,  Rami Yadid and Ken Wallace  and tours with R+B great Patti Austin, top selling fusion/new age pianist Keiko Matsui and The Manhattan Transfer. He continues to work with R&B/Jazz Grammy winner Patti Austin in all variations of her touring band.

Musical affiliations

Here is a short list of Steve Hass' musical affiliations in alphabetical order:
 Abe Laboriel Sr.
 Adam Rogers
 Art Garfunkel
 Billy Childs
 Bob Berg
 Bob Mintzer
 Bob Sheppard
 Brandon Fields
 Cher
 Danilo Perez
 Debbie Gibson
 Dionne Warwick 
 George Garzone
 Jennifer Love Hewitt
 Jimmy Haslip
 Jon Hendricks
 Katisse
 Keiko Matsui
 Larry Coryell
 Lucy Woodward
 Mark Turner
 Mavis Staples
 Mindi Abair
 Miri Ben-Ari
 Nicholas Payton
 Patti Austin 
 Ralph Alessi/Ravi Coltrane Group
 Randy Brecker
 Ravi Coltrane
 Richard Bona
 Ruben Wilson
 Stanely Jordan
 Suzanne Vega
 Terell Stafford
 The Alan Pasqua Group
 The Boneshakers 
 The BBC Big Band
.The Count Basie Big Band 
.The Duke Ellington Orchestra
 The Christian McBride Band
 The East Village Opera Company
 The John Scofield Band(Music Of Ray Charles)
 The John Scofield Trio with John Benitez
 The Lonnie Plaxico Group
 The Manhattan Transfer
 The New York Voices
 The Tierney Sutton Band
 Timothy Lefebvre
 Traci Lords
 Vinx
 Wayne Krantz
 Will Lee
 Wynton Marsalis

and many more

Abbreviated Discography

References

1975 births
Living people
American people of Greek descent
Berklee College of Music alumni
American session musicians
Musicians from New York City
People from Island Park, New York
Musicians from Los Angeles
People from Ronkonkoma, New York
20th-century American drummers
American male drummers
21st-century American drummers
20th-century American male musicians
21st-century American male musicians